Milwaukee Irish Fest (locally known as Irish Fest) is a yearly Irish-American festival held at the Henry Maier Festival Park, on Lake Michigan, United States, every third weekend in August. Over 130,000 people attend the Fest each year to take in nearly 250 acts on 17 stages. The four-day festival in downtown Milwaukee started in 1981, founded by Edward J. Ward. Irish Fest is the largest of the ethnic festivals held at the Summerfest grounds which report attendance, and holds claim to the largest celebration of Irish Culture in the world.

Festival highlights include: 
 Performances from local Milwaukee Irish Dance troupes
 Music from nearly 250 artists from around the world, sung in both English and Irish
 Stages for Céilí dancing
 An area to learn Céilí dance
 Celebrations of Irish sport:Gaelic Football, Hurling, and Currach racing
 Authentic Irish Cuisine
 A 5k Run/Walk to the festival
 Poetry and photography contests
 Liturgy for Peace and Justice held in the Marcus Amphitheater on Sunday morning

The annual closing event is the Scattering, a gathering of many of the festival's musicians playing together in one combined session, with fifty or more musicians on the stage at one time not uncommon.

Irish people the world over come to see the festival from as far off as England, Scotland, Egypt, Pakistan and Ireland itself. Many of Ireland's news stations will send reporters over to cover the festival.

Irish Fest celebrated its 25th anniversary in 2005, which saw the opening of the new Celtic Roots stage. President of Ireland, Mary McAleese also attended that year's fest.

There was no Irish Fest in 2020 as officials cited the COVID-19 pandemic as grounds for scrapping most events & moving others online.

Each year, a particular Irish family name (clan) is honoured at the festival. 

Some of the Irish clan names that have been honoured:
1987: Mangin
1995: Conarchy/Conachy
1999: Cummings/Cummins
2000: Delaney/Delany
2001: McAteer
2004: Murphy
2005: All festival Volunteers (in honor of 25th anniversary of Irish Fest)
2006: Toomey/Twomey (O'Tuama)
2007: Gogin/Goggins
2008: Carroll
2009: O'Donoghue
2011: Fitzgerald
2012: Higgins
2013: Gallagher
2014: O'Loughlin

References

External links
Official Milwaukee Irish Fest website
Official Milwaukee Irish Fest Mobile website

European-American culture in Milwaukee
Irish-American culture in Wisconsin
Festivals in Milwaukee
Henry Maier Festival Park